Gwonseon-gu is the south-western district of the city of Suwon in Gyeonggi-do, South Korea.

Administrative divisions
Gwonseon-gu is divided into the following "dong"s.
Geumgok-dong (Hangul: 금곡동)
Homaesil-dong (Hangul: 호매실동)
Gokseon-dong (Hangul: 곡선동) (divided in turn into Gokbanjeong-dong, Daehwanggyo-dong and Gwonseon-dong)
Guun-dong (Hangul: 구운동)
Gwonseon-dong (Hangul: 권선동) (divided in turn into Gwonseon 1 and 2 dong)
Ipbuk-dong (Hangul: 입북동) (divided in turn into Ipbuk-dong and Dangsu-dong)
Pyeong-dong (Hangul: 평동) (divided in turn into Pyeong-dong, Pyeongni-dong, Gosaek-dong and Omokcheon-dong)
Seodun-dong (Hangul: 서둔동) (divided in turn into Seodun-dong and Tap-dong)
Seryu-dong (Hangul: 세류동) (divided in turn into Seryu 1 to 3 dong [Seryu 2 Dong: Jangji-dong])

Critical Infrastructure 
 Gwonseon-gu office
 West Suwon Library
 Gyeonggi-do Youth Cultural Creation Center(Gyeonggi Sangsang campus)
 Seoul National University Arboretum

See also
Suwon
Jangan-gu
Paldal-gu
Yeongtong-gu

External links
Suwon City government website 

Gwonseon-gu website 

Districts of Suwon